The 2008 Orlando mayoral election was held on January 29, 2008 to elect the mayor of Orlando, Florida. Incumbent mayor Buddy Dyer was elected to a second full term.

Municipal elections in Orlando and Orange County are non-partisan.  Had no candidate received a majority of the votes in the general election, a runoff would have been held between the two candidates that received the greatest number of votes.

Results

References

2008
2008 Florida elections
2008 United States mayoral elections
2000s in Orlando, Florida